The 2012–13 season was a FK Vardar's 21st consecutive season in First League. This article shows player statistics and all official matches that the club was played during the 2012–13 season.

In that season Vardar was won the championship for the second consecutive time, sixth time in his history.

Squad

As of March, 2013

Competitions

First League

League table

Results summary

Matches

Macedonian Football Cup

First round

Second round

Quarter-final

Semi-final

UEFA Champions League

Second qualifying round

Statistics

Top scorers

Notes

References

FK Vardar seasons
Vardar
Vardar